Saliencia Lakes are a conjoined group of post-glacial lakes  in Somiedo, Asturias, Spain. They are situated in the Somiedo Natural Park and are composed of the following: Calabazosa (or Black Lake), Cerveriz, Almagrera Lagoon (or La Mina), and Lago de la Cueva. Fauna in the lake valley includes the presence of Eurasian brown bear, Otter, Egyptian vulture and Golden eagle. The majority of amphibians inside the park are found by these lakes, including Alpine newt, Palmate newt, Fire salamander, common toad, Common midwife toad, Common frog, and the Iberian frog. The lakes are protected space within the World Network of Biosphere Reserves of Somiedo Natural Park, declared a natural monument on 22 May 2003. Myth has it that the lakes are guarded by xanas (fairy princesses).

Gallery

See also 
 Conjunto lacustre de Somiedo

References

Bibliography

External links 
 
 Hiking route by the Saliencia lakes

Lakes of Asturias